The Korean Magazine Museum is a museum in the district of Yeouido in Seoul, South Korea. It was established on March 21, 2002, to promote Korean magazines in the competitive global arena. The museum consists of three underground floors and seven upperground floors for a total floor space of 1703 pyeong (app. 5,623 m2). Admission is free with opening hours from Monday to Saturday (10:00-18:00). The museum is closed on Sundays and national holidays.

Facilities

 Magazine exhibition space (exhibit of modern magazines)
 Magazine museum (exhibit of rare magazines)
 Internet zone
 Reading space
 Storage

Location and Transportation

Situated near Yeouido Station of  Line 5 on the  Seoul Metro system, bus stop for intercity buses is Yeouido Full Gospel Church.

See also
List of museums in South Korea

References
This article was written with material released to the public domain, provided by Seoul City's official Knowledge Sharing Project.

External links
Official site

Museums in Seoul
Media museums
Museums established in 2002
2002 establishments in South Korea